The Embassy of the Republic of Indonesia in Addis Ababa is the diplomatic mission of the Republic of Indonesia to the Federal Democratic Republic of Ethiopia. The embassy is concurrently accredited to the Republic of Djibouti. In addition, the ambassador serves as the Indonesian representative for the African Union. The first Indonesian ambassador to Ethiopia was Suadi Soeromiharjo (1964–1968). The current ambassador, Al Busyra Basnur, was appointed by President Joko Widodo on 7 January 2019.

History 

Diplomatic relations between Indonesia and Ethiopia were established in 1961. Afterwards, the Indonesian embassy in Addis Ababa opened on 20 October 1964. Initially, the embassy staff rented offices, however, on 6 May 1966, construction started on the building of a new chancery and official residence of the ambassador called Wisma Duta at the current location. Construction was completed in 1968.

Gallery

See also 

 Ethiopia–Indonesia relations
 List of diplomatic missions of Indonesia
 List of diplomatic missions in Ethiopia

References 

Addis Ababa
Indonesia
Buildings and structures in Addis Ababa